Archana (born as Sudha) is an Indian actress and Kuchipudi and Kathak dancer, known for her works in Telugu, Tamil, Malayalam and Kannada films. She is the recipient of two National Film Awards.

Early life 
Archana was born in Krishna district, Andhra Pradesh, India as Sudha. During her childhood, her family moved to Madras (Present day Chennai).

Filmography

Tamil
 Thai Ponggal (1980)
 Thunive Thozhan (1980)
 Kadhal Oviyam (1982)
 Vasanthame Varuga (1983)
 Neengal Kettavai as Radha (1984)
 Yemaatrathe Yemaaraathe (1985)
 Puyal Kadantha Boomi (1985)
 Rettai Vaal Kuruvi (1987)
 Veedu (1988) as Sudha 
 Sandhya Ragam (1989)
 Vaidehi Vandhachu (1991)
 Parattai Engira Azhagu Sundaram (2007) as Meenakshi
 Onbadhu Roobai Nottu (2007) 
 Keni (2018) 
 Seethakaathi (2018) 
 Namma Veettu Pillai (2019) as Thenmozhi, Arumpon's mother
 Azhiyatha Kolangal 2 (2019)

Telugu
 Madhura Geetam (1981)
 Nireekshana (1986)
 Ladies Tailor (1986)
 Ukku Sankellu (1988)
 Daasi (1988) as Kamakshi; Nominated-Filmfare Award for Best Actress – Telugu
 Yogi Vemana (1988) as Vishwada
 Matti Manushulu (1990)
 Bharat Bandh (1991)
 Chakravyuham (1992)
 Pachcha Toranam (1994)
 Police Venkataswamy (1983)

Malayalam
 Thammil Thammil (1985)
 Malamukalile Daivam (1986) as Marie
 Piravi (1989) as Chakyar's daughter
 Onnaam Muhurtham (1991) as Radhika Vishwanath
 Yamanam (1992) as Ambil
 Sammohanam (1994) as Pennu
 Madamma (1996)
 Kinar (2018)

Kannada
 Premigala Saval (1984) 
 Belli Naaga (1986)
 Guri (1986) as Shantadevi
 Ondu Muttina Kathe (1987) as Kaaki
 Huliya (1996) as Mydani

Bengali
 Bagh Bahadur (1989) as Radha

Hindi
 Umang (1970)
 Buddha Mil Gaya (1971) as Deepa
 Nishad (2002) as Sati Gujaral

English
 GangapurTelevisionMeenakshi Ponnunga'' on Zee Tamil

Accolades

References

External links
 

Living people
Actresses in Telugu cinema
Actresses from Vijayawada
Telugu actresses
Best Actress National Film Award winners
Actresses in Malayalam cinema
Actresses in Tamil cinema
Tamil Nadu State Film Awards winners
Filmfare Awards South winners
M.G.R. Government Film and Television Training Institute alumni
Actresses in Kannada cinema
Actresses in Hindi cinema
Nandi Award winners
Indian film actresses
20th-century Indian actresses
21st-century Indian actresses
Year of birth missing (living people)
Actresses in Bengali cinema